Trimethylsilyl iodide (iodotrimethylsilane or TMSI) is an organosilicon compound with the chemical formula (CH3)3SiI. It is a colorless, volatile liquid at room temperature.

Preparation
Trimethylsilyl iodide may be prepared by the oxidative cleavage of hexamethyldisilane by iodine or by the cleavage of hexamethyldisiloxane with aluminium triiodide.
 TMS-TMS + I2 → 2 TMSI (TMS = (CH3)3Si)
 3 TMS-O-TMS + 2 AlI3 → 6 TMSI + Al2O3

Applications
Trimethylsilyl iodide is used to introduce the trimethylsilyl group onto alcohols (ROH):

R-OH + TMSI → R-OTMS + HI

This type of reaction may be useful for gas chromatography analysis; the resultant silyl ether is more volatile than the underivatized original materials. However, for the preparation of bulk trimethylsilylated material, trimethylsilyl chloride may be preferred due to its lower cost.

TMSI reacts with alkyl ethers (ROR′), forming silyl ethers (ROSiMe3) and iodoalkanes (RI) that can be hydrolyzed to alcohols (ROH).

Trimethylsilyl iodide is also used for the removing of the Boc protecting group, especially where other deprotection methods are too harsh for the substrate.

References

Iodides
Reagents for organic chemistry
Trimethylsilyl compounds